The Mission sui iuris of Mossul was a Latin Catholic missionary pre-diocesan jurisdiction in northern Iraq, notably Kurdistan.

It was exempt, i.e. directly dependent on the Holy See (notably the Roman missionary Congregation Propaganda Fide), not part of any ecclesiastical province.

It was established in 1750, without formal Latin precursor jurisdiction, and suppressed in 1969, without formal successor.

Ordinaries 
(all Roman Rite and missionary members of a Latin congregation)

Ecclesiastical Superiors of Mossul 
 Father Domenico Berré, Dominican Order (O.P.) (? – 1921)
 Gundisalvo Galland, O.P. (1923 – 1924)
 Bertrando Labbé, O.P. (1931 – 1937)
 Ceslas Tunmer, O.P. (1937 – 1953)
 Joseph Omez, O.P. (1953 – 1969)

See also 
 Chaldean Catholic Archeparchy of Mossul (not metropolitan)
 Syrian Catholic Archeparchy of Mossul (not metropolitan)
 Roman Catholic Archdiocese of Baghdad (not metropolitan)

References

External links 
 GCatholic 

Missions sui iuris
Former Roman Catholic dioceses in Asia